Eugene Hughes may refer to:

 Eugene Hughes (educator) (1934–2021), American university president
 Eugene Hughes (snooker player) (born 1955), Irish snooker player
 Eugene Hughes (Gaelic footballer), former Gaelic football player for Monaghan
 Eugene Orlando Hughes (born 1969), Irish filmmaker and psychotherapist